Guest House is a 1980 Indian Hindi-language horror film directed by Shyam Ramsay, Tulsi Ramsay and produced by the Ramsay Brothers. This film was released in 1980 in the banner of Ramsay Productions. The music of the movie was composed by Bappi Lahiri.

Plot 
Christopher, a psychic with ability to contact spirits, goes to a remote village for conducting a seance. He stays in a guest house at the village. Christopher has a valuable ring in his finger. The guest house's manager & co-worker murders him and cuts his hand off for the ring and buries the corpse. The dead hand revives with evil power to avenge.

Cast 

 Vijayendra Ghatge as Suraj
 Padmini Kapila as Sunita
 Prem Nath as Christopher
 Narendra Nath as John
 Rajendra Nath as Bawra
 Mac Mohan as Shaktiprasad Srivastav
 Pinchoo Kapoor as Mr. Mehra
 Sudhir as Police officer
 Sujit Kumar as Kalia
 Roopesh Kumar as Kantilal
 Prem Krishen as Prem
 Sudha Shivpuri as Mrs. Mehra
 Birbal
 Madhu Kapoor as Prema
 Rajkishore Rana
 Dev Kumar
 Shruti Astha

References

External links 
 

1980 films
1980s Hindi-language films
Films scored by Bappi Lahiri
Indian horror films
1980 horror films
Hindi-language horror films